This is the discography documenting albums and singles released by American R&B/soul singer Barry White.

Albums

Studio albums

Compilation albums

Singles

 Singles credited to Barry White with the Majestics
 Single credited to Barry White with the Atlantics
 Single credited to Lee Barry
 Single credited to Gene West

As featured performer

Other appearances

References

Rhythm and blues discographies
Discographies of American artists
Soul music discographies
Disco discographies